Arturo "Arte" Moreno (born August 14, 1946) is an American businessman. On May 15, 2003, he became the first Mexican-American to own a major sports team in the United States when he purchased the Anaheim Angels baseball team from the Walt Disney Company. In August 2022, he announced that he would explore a possible sale of the franchise, but in January 2023, he decided not to sell the team.

Early life and education 
Moreno was born to a Mexican American family in Tucson, Arizona, the oldest of 11 children of Maria and Arturo Moreno, who immigrated from Mexico. His father ran a small print shop; his grandfather owned Tucson's first Spanish-language newspaper. In 1965, graduated from high school and in 1966, he was drafted into the United States Army and fought in the Vietnam War. After returning to civilian life in 1968, he enrolled at the University of Arizona where he graduated in 1973 with a degree in marketing.

Career

Advertising background 

After school, he was hired to work at Eller Outdoor, an advertising company. He traveled across the country for the next seven years, relocating several times and in 1984, he moved back to Arizona, settling in Phoenix, where he was hired by billboard company Outdoor Systems. In 1984, Moreno and his friend Wally Kelly attempted unsuccessfully to buy the firm from owner William S. Levine. Moreno and Kelly entered into a partnership with Levine, and Moreno later became its president and chief executive officer.

In 1996, Moreno took Outdoor Systems public. The company's stock soared, and in 1998 Outdoor Systems was purchased by Infinity Broadcasting for $8 billion.

Baseball ownership 
With baseball being Moreno's favorite pastime, he purchased the Salt Lake Trappers minor league team alongside 17 other investors in 1986. The group owned the team until 1992, and the venture proved to be a resounding financial success.

By 2001, Moreno wished to own a Major League Baseball (MLB) team. He attempted to buy controlling interest in his home state's Arizona Diamondbacks, but no deal could be reached. He nonetheless remained determined to own a Major League team, and soon set his sights on the 2002 World Series champion Anaheim Angels.

It was announced in April 2003 that Moreno had agreed with The Walt Disney Company to purchase the team for $180 million. On May 15, 2003, MLB commissioner Bud Selig announced that the sale of the Angels to Moreno had been approved. One of the first people to congratulate Moreno after the news was Diamondbacks' owner Jerry Colangelo, a personal friend who declared it a good opportunity for Moreno.

Angels owner 
Moreno soon demonstrated a willingness to spend the money necessary to sign premium players, including star outfielder Vladimir Guerrero. He also took a hands-on approach, becoming a regular attendee of the team's home games and periodically leaving his owner's box during games to mingle with fans in the regular stadium seating areas and concourses. All of these moves proved very popular with fans. In the first year of his ownership, the Angels drew more than three million fans, 750,000 more than their championship season.

However, Moreno encountered a substantial backlash from fans of the team, and in particular, from the city leadership of Anaheim, California, over his decision in 2005 to change the name of the team from the Anaheim Angels to the Los Angeles Angels of Anaheim. Moreno saw the change as part of an overall strategy to increase the team's revenue by actively marketing it to, and associating it with, the entire Los Angeles metropolitan area, rather than restricting the team's identity to the city of Anaheim and to Orange County. In recent years, the San Diego Zoo and Los Angeles Times have been notable club sponsors, while all baseball TV rightsholders also use some variation of the team's new name, indicating the effect of Moreno's plan. But the move outraged Anaheim city officials, who responded by suing the team. It also angered a substantial segment of the Angels' fan base in Orange County, who took pride in the team's identity being distinct from Los Angeles. The awkwardness of the of Anaheim suffix, appended to satisfy a contractual requirement for Anaheim to be included in the team's name, also caused the new name to become the subject of national ridicule. Eventually, the team won the lawsuit filed by the city. Whatever displeasure fans felt over the name change has not translated into diminished support for the team, as attendance levels have remained well above 2002 numbers.

Aside from the name controversy, Moreno's first few seasons as owner of the Angels were largely successful. The team posted three consecutive winning seasons for the first time in club history (2007–2009), including winning the American League Western Division championship in 2004, 2005, 2007, 2008, 2009, and 2014 when they finished with a league leading 98 regular season wins. However, the Angels, even with Albert Pujols and Mike Trout at the helm for the team, could not lead them back to the postseason or win a postseason game. From 2010 to 2022, the Angels failed to win a postseason game (the longest gap since their drought from 1987 to 2001) despite a massive deal for Trout for over $400 million and high priced signings of players such as Pujols, Anthony Rendon, Josh Hamilton, and Shohei Ohtani that totaled over $500 million. A losing season in 2022 would be the seventh straight losing season for the team, which would match the record for most ever in franchise history after the 1971-77 era.

Just prior to the start of the 2006 Major League season, Moreno scored another success in signing a lucrative contract with Fox Sports Net for the television broadcast rights for the Angels' regular season games. The ten-year deal significantly increased the team's television revenue. In April 2006, Forbes magazine estimated the team to be worth $368 million—twice the amount Moreno paid for the club only three years earlier; in January 2018 Forbes estimated the franchise value at $1.75 billion.

[Moreno] has really done an amazing job with the franchise. To double the value in three years without getting a new stadium is an incredible feat.
— Forbes magazine associate editor Kurt Badenhausen

In October 2020, Moreno, through his company SRB Management, agreed to purchase Angel Stadium and the surrounding parking lots from the City of Anaheim for $320 million. In May 2022, it was reported that an FBI had conducted a corruption investigation into the dealings of the city and the stadium sale, which led to the resignation of Anaheim mayor Harry Sidhu on May 24. In light of the scandal, the Anaheim City Council voted to cancel the sale later that day.

On August 23, 2022, Moreno officially announced that he would explore a possible sale of the Angels franchise. In a public statement, Moreno said that he and his family decided "now is the time" after a "a great deal of thoughtful consideration". The franchise was estimated to be worth $2.2 billion by Forbes in an analysis from March 2022.

Other business interests 
On February 26, 2006, Moreno led a partnership of buyers to purchase Radio 830 KMXE, the nation's largest Spanish-language AM radio station. For the 2006 and 2007 seasons Radio 830 KMXE served as the Spanish-language radio broadcast outlet for the Angels. On July 17, 2007, the station began broadcasting from new studios located in Angel Stadium. Just before the 2008 season the station became AM830 KLAA (AM) and went all English language, including the Angels game broadcasts. The station has since added morning and afternoon sports talk shows to its lineup.

While it seems a new trend for sports teams to buy their own radio stations (see the St. Louis Cardinals and the Washington Commanders), for the Angels it is a tradition started by team founder Gene Autry, who owned 710 KMPC and broadcast the games for years.

Personal life 
Moreno has been married twice. He has three children.

In 1997, Moreno and his wife established the Moreno Family Foundation, which supports non-profit organizations focusing on youth and education. It also has provided support to the athletic programs at the University of Arizona.

Aside from this, Moreno is vigilant about maintaining his privacy. He refuses most interview requests, and does not discuss his personal life publicly. His family and friends also avoid commenting on his personal life publicly, though off the record, those who know him describe him as "unabashed in his support of Republican politics" and as particularly dedicated to his family.

In September 2020 he endorsed Donald Trump for president, saying "it’s very necessary to vote for President Trump".

References 

1946 births
Living people
United States Army personnel of the Vietnam War
American billionaires
American sportspeople of Mexican descent
Anaheim Angels owners
Businesspeople from Tucson, Arizona
American advertising executives
Los Angeles Angels owners
Los Angeles Angels of Anaheim owners
University of Arizona alumni
United States Army soldiers